Lorenzo Fargas (born 19 October 1957) is a former professional tennis player from Spain.

Biography
Fargas, a right-handed player from Barcelona, made most of his Grand Prix appearances in his home tournament, the Torneo Godó. He appeared in the singles main draw at Barcelona on 11 occasions and was a doubles semi-finalist in 1984. As a doubles player he reached 132 in the world and won one Challenger title.

A former coach of Albert Costa, Fargas is now a youth coach at the Sanchez-Casal Tennis Academy. He has four children.

Challenger titles

Doubles: (1)

References

External links
 
 

1957 births
Living people
Spanish male tennis players
Spanish tennis coaches
Tennis players from Barcelona